The Union of Socialist Groups and Clubs (UGCS) was a socialist club in France led by Jean Poperen after he was expelled from the Unified Socialist Party. The UGCS joined the Federation of the Democratic and Socialist Left before merging into the new PS at the Issy-les-Moulineaux Congress.

Political parties of the French Fifth Republic
Political parties established in 1967
Political parties disestablished in 1969
Socialist Party (France)